The  is the name of Japanese aerial lift line, operated by Nagasaki Ropeway and Aquarium. Opened in 1958, the line climbs Mount Inasa, to the west of the city of Nagasaki, Nagasaki.

Closed from 7 May 2015 until 5 Feb 2016. There are replacement buses from Nagasaki station.

Basic data
Cable length: 
Vertical interval:

See also
List of aerial lifts in Japan

External links
 Official website

Aerial tramways in Japan
1958 establishments in Japan